Testimony Live is a live version of Neal Morse's Testimony. It was recorded live on stage in November 2003. With seven other musicians, Morse performed Testimony live in various cities across Europe. The show in the 013 Club, Tilburg, the Netherlands was filmed and recorded for this DVD released in 2004.

Track listing
DVD 1:
Part One
 "The Land of the Beginning Again"
 "Overture No. 1"
 "California Nights"
 "Colder in the Sun"
 "Sleeping Jesus"
 "Interlude"
 "The Prince of the Power of the Air"
 "The Promise"
 "Wasted Life
Part Two
 "Overture No. 2"
 "Break of Day"
 "Power in the Air"
 "Somber Days"
 "Long Story"
 "It's All I Can Do"
Part Three
 "Transformation"
 "Ready to Try"
 "Sing It High"
Part Four
 "Moving in My Heart'
 "I Am Willing"
 "In the Middle"
 "The Storm Before the Calm"
 "Oh, To Feel Him"
 "God's Theme"
Part Five
 "Overture No. 3"
 "Rejoice"
 "Oh Lord My God"
 "God's Theme 2"
 "The Land of the Beginning Again"
DVD 2:
Encore
 "We All Need Some Light"
 "The Light"
 "Stranger in Your Soul"
Addition material
 Tour Documentary

Personnel 

 Neal Morse – vocals, keyboards, guitars
 Mike Portnoy – drums, backing vocals
 Eric Brenton – guitar, violin, pedal steel guitar, mandolin, vocals
 John Krovosa – electric cello
 Bert Baldwin – keyboards, vocals
 Rick Altizer – guitar, keyboards, percussion, vocals
 Randy George – bass, keyboards, backing vocals
 Mark Leniger - percussion, saxophone, backing vocals

References

Neal Morse video albums
2002 video albums
Live video albums
2002 live albums